Bank BGŻ was a continental cycling team based in Poland that participated in UCI Continental Circuits races. From 2004 to 2010 it was known as "DHL–Author"; from 2011, the team has the homonymous Polish bank as its main sponsor. It disbanded at the end of the 2013 season.

Major wins 

2000
Stage 2 Dookoła Mazowsza, Zbigniew Wyrzykowski
Stage 3 Dookoła Mazowsza, Marek Kaminski
2001
Stage 2 Dookoła Mazowsza, Marek Kaminski
Stage 4 Dookoła Mazowsza, Paweł Szaniawski
2002
Memorial Andrzeja Kaczyny, Bartłomiej Ksobiak
2003
Stage 3 Bałtyk–Karkonosze Tour, Grzegorz Rosolinski
Stage 6b Bałtyk–Karkonosze Tour, Robert Radosz
2004
Memoriał Andrzeja Trochanowskiego, Mariusz Witecki
Stages 2 & 4 Bałtyk–Karkonosze Tour, Marcin Gebka
Stage 6 Course de la Solidarité Olympique, Marcin Gebka
2005
GP Kooperativa, Piotr Przydział
Overall Bałtyk–Karkonosze Tour, Radosław Romanik
Stage 4, Marcin Gebka
Stage 5, Radosław Romanik
GP Judendorf-Strassengel, Krzysztof Ciesielski
Stage 7 Course de la Solidarité Olympique, Dariusz Skoczylas
Stage 2 Tour of Małopolska, Radosław Romanik
Coupe des Carpathes, Radosław Romanik
2006
Overall Course de la Solidarité Olympique, Robert Radosz
Stage 1, Robert Radosz
Puchar Ministra Obrony Narodowej, Marcin Gebka
Overall Tour de Slovaquie, Radosław Romanik
Stage 4, Radosław Romanik
Stage 4a Tour of Bulgaria, Robert Radosz
2007
GP Hydraulika Mikolasek, Marcin Sapa
Overall Bałtyk–Karkonosze Tour, Roman Broniš
Stages 2 & 5, Piotr Zaradny
Stage 6, Radosław Romanik
Stage 7, Marcin Sapa
Stages 1, 3 & 6 Course de la Solidarité Olympique, Piotr Zaradny
Pomorski Klasyk, Marcin Sapa
Stages 1, 2, 4 & 6 Dookoła Mazowsza, Piotr Zaradny
Overall Tour of Małopolska, Mateusz Komar
Stage 1, Mateusz Komar
Prologue Szlakiem Walk Majora Hubala, Piotr Zaradny
Stage 1 Szlakiem Walk Majora Hubala, Mateusz Komar
Stage 3 Szlakiem Walk Majora Hubala, Daniel Czajkowski
Stage 1 Tour de Slovaquie, Marci Sapa
Stage 5 Tour de Slovaquie, Kazimierz Stafiej
Stages 1a & 5 Tour de Croatie, Marcin Sapa
Stage 1b Tour de Croatie, Piotr Zaradny
2008
Overall Bałtyk–Karkonosze Tour, Radosław Romanik
Stage 2, Piotr Zaradny
 Road Race Championships, Marcin Sapa
 Time Trial Championships, Łukasz Bodnar
Overall Course de la Solidarité Olympique, Łukasz Bodnar
Stage 2, Piotr Zaradny
Stage 4, Łukasz Bodnar
Pomorski Klasyk, Dariusz Baranowski
Overall Dookoła Mazowsza, Marcin Sapa
Stage 2, Piotr Zaradny
Stage 5, Team Time Trial
Overall Tour of Małopolska, Marcin Sapa
Stage 1, Marcin Sapa
2009
Stage 4 Bałtyk–Karkonosze Tour, Mateusz Komar
Overall Tour of Małopolska, Artur Detko
Stage 1, Artur Detko
2010
2011
Stage 4 Tour de Slovaquie, Paweł Cieślik
2012
Memoriał Andrzeja Trochanowskiego, Tomasz Smoleń
Stage 2 Tour of Małopolska, Paweł Cieślik
Stage 5 Tour de Slovaquie, Tomasz Smoleń
Overall Course de la Solidarité Olympique, Mariusz Witecki
Stage 2 Okolo Jižních Čech, Tomasz Smoleń
2013
Overall Tour of Małopolska, Łukasz Bodnar
Stage 2, Łukasz Bodnar

2013 squad 
As of 22 January 2013.

References

External links

UCI Continental Teams (Europe)
Cycling teams based in Poland
Cycling teams established in 2000
Defunct cycling teams based in Poland
Cycling teams disestablished in 2013
2000 establishments in Poland
2013 disestablishments in Poland